Group A of the 2006 Fed Cup Americas Zone Group II was one of two pools in the Americas Zone Group II of the 2006 Fed Cup. Three teams competed in a round robin competition, with the top team and the bottom two teams proceeding to their respective sections of the play-offs: the top teams played for advancement to the 2007 Group I.

Bolivia vs. Panama

Venezuela vs. Panama

Bolivia vs. Venezuela

See also
Fed Cup structure

References

External links
 Fed Cup website

2006 Fed Cup Americas Zone